Contemporary worship duo Shane & Shane have released 27 studio albums (including one holiday album) and one live album, beginning with their first release, Psalms, in 2002.

The duo has released fourteen additional volumes of music and two additional Christmas albums specifically for their project The Worship Initiative.

Studio albums

Live albums

Christmas albums

Extended plays

References

Discographies of American artists
Christian music discographies